European Canadians, or Euro-Canadians, are Canadians who were either born in or can trace their ancestry to the continent of Europe. They form the largest panethnic group within Canada.

In the 2021 Canadian census, 19,062,115 Canadians self-identified as having origins from European countries, forming approximately 52.5% of the total Canadian population. Due to changes in the census format, these totals are not directly comparable with previous censuses. Further, as the census permitted a respondent to enter up to six possible ethnic origins in their census questionnaire, this figure includes individual respondents that reported a mixed ancestry of both European and non-European origins. Therefore, it is not possible to accurately assess the total number of European Canadians as a percentage of Canada's total population, or a precise change from previous years.

Terminology
As with other panethnic groups, Statistics Canada records ethnic ancestry by employing the term "European origins" under the ethnic origin population section in the census data, but does not  specifically use the term "European Canadian". "Euro-Canadians" and "European Canadians" are terms primarily used by those opposed to immigration to Canada from the Third World, and their use has been criticised as conflating distinctions between very different European groups and nationalities.  Those employing the terms can recognise that most Canadians of European descent do not see that as their collective identity and instead identify with a specific ethnicity or country of ancestral origin, characterising themselves as for example "Anglo" or "Québecois" rather than as part of a larger "Euro-Canadian" group. For most of the history of European settlement in North America, the French and the English were seen as two distinct races, with distinct cultures and national spirits.

Statistics Canada has cautioned that "the reporting of ethnicity, and subsequent interpretation of the results, has become increasingly complex due to a number of factors, and poses challenges for historical data comparisons. The concept of ethnicity is fluid and is probably one of the more complex concepts measured in the census."  As well, patterns of self-reporting ethnic origins on the census vary with different population groups in Canada, with particular fluidity on self-reporting of the category "Canadian".  Use of statistics in this subject area must be approached with these cautions in mind. The sum of the identified ethnic groups is greater than the total population estimate, because a person may report more than one ethnic origin in the census, therefore, it is not entirely accurate to assess the total number of European Canadians as a percentage of Canada's total population.

The phrase "Euro-Canadian" can sometimes be a term used by members of the far right who express racist ideology, as for example in the name "Euro-Canadian Freedom Front", a  telephone hotline maintained by the neo-Nazi Heritage Front in the 1990s.

Subgroups
There are several subgroups of Canadians of European origin. Although approximately defined categories (due to imprecise, or ethnocultural, regionalization of the continent), the subgroups have been utilized widely in ethnic and cultural identification. This is especially relevant in diaspora, as is the case with European people in Canada.

Statistics Canada does not use the term "European Canadian". The 2021 census asked individuals to self-identify their ethnic origins, within six general categories:

 British Isles origins, British Canadians (English Canadians, Irish Canadians, Scottish Canadians, and Welsh Canadians)
French origins, including French Canadians
 Western European origins (except French origins), including Austrian Canadians, Bavarian Canadians, Belgian Canadians, Dutch Canadians, Flemish Canadians, Frisian Canadians, German Canadians, Luxembourger Canadians, Swiss Canadians
 Northern European origins (except British Isles origins), including  Danish Canadians, Finnish Canadians, Icelandic Canadians, Norwegian Canadians, Swedish Canadians
 Eastern European origins, including Belarusian Canadians, Bulgarian Canadians, Czech Canadians, Estonian Canadians, Hungarian Canadians, Latvian Canadians, Lithuanian Canadians, Moldovan Canadians, Polish Canadians, Romanian Canadians, Russian Canadians, Slovak Canadians and Ukrainian Canadians
 Southern European origins, including Albanian Canadians, Cypriot Canadians, Greek Canadians, Italian Canadians, Maltese Canadians, Portuguese Canadians, Spanish Canadians and Yugoslav Canadians (Bosnian Canadians, Croatian Canadians, Kosovar Canadians, Macedonian Canadians, Montenegrin Canadians, Serbian Canadians, and Slovenian Canadians)

History 

The first documented source of Scots in what would become Canada comes from the Saga of Eric the Red and the Viking expedition of 1010 AD to Vinland (literally, the land of meadows), which is believed to refer to the island of Newfoundland. The Viking prince Thorfinn Karlsefni took two Scottish slaves to Vinland. When the longships moored along the coast, they sent the slaves ashore to run along the waterfront to gauge whether it was safe for the rest of the crew to follow. After the Scots survived a day without being attacked, by either human or animal, the Vikings deemed it safe to spend the night ashore. The expedition was abandoned three years later; the original sagas were passed on in an oral tradition and then written down 250 years later.

16th century 
English Canadian history starts with the attempts to establish English settlements in Newfoundland in the sixteenth century.  The first English settlement in present-day Canada was at St. Johns Newfoundland, in 1583. Newfoundland's population was significantly influenced by Irish and English immigration, much of it as a result of the migratory fishery in the decades prior to the Great Famine of Ireland.

The first recorded Irish presence in the area of present-day Canada dates from 1536, when Irish fishermen from Cork traveled to Newfoundland.

17th century 
The French were the first Europeans to establish a continuous presence in what is now Canada. French settlers from Normandy, Perche, Beauce, Brittany, Maine, Anjou, Touraine, Poitou, Aunis, Angoumois, Saintonge and Gascony were the first Europeans to permanently colonize what is now Quebec, parts of Ontario, Acadia, and select areas of Western Canada, all in Canada (See French colonization of the Americas.) Their colonies of New France (also commonly called Canada) stretched across what today are the Maritime provinces, southern Quebec and Ontario, as well as the entire Mississippi River Valley.

Hélène Desportes is considered the first White child born in New France. She was born circa 1620, to Pierre Desportes (born Lisieux, Normandie, France) and Françoise Langlois.

The first permanent European settlements in Canada were at Port Royal in 1605 and Quebec City in 1608 as fur trading posts. The territories of New France were Canada, Acadia (later renamed Nova Scotia), and Louisiana. The inhabitants of the French colony of Canada (modern-day Quebec) called themselves the Canadiens, and came mostly from northwestern France. The early inhabitants of Acadia, or Acadians (Acadiens), came mostly but not exclusively from the southwestern regions of France.

Canadien explorers and fur traders would come to be known as coureurs des bois and voyageurs, while those who settled on farms in Canada would come to be known as habitants. Many French Canadians are the descendants of the King's Daughters (Filles du Roi) of this era. A few  also are the descendants of mixed French and Algonquian marriages (see also Metis people and Acadian people).

18th century

Early to mid century 
The area that forms the present day province of Nova Scotia was contested by the British and French in the eighteenth century. French settlements at Port Royal, Louisbourg and what is now Prince Edward Island were seized by the British. After the 1713 Treaty of Utrecht ceded the French colony of Acadia (today's mainland Nova Scotia and New Brunswick) to Great Britain, efforts to colonize the province were limited to small settlements in Canso and Annapolis Royal.

In 1749, Colonel Edward Cornwallis was given command of an expedition for the settlement of Chebucto by some three thousand persons, many of whom were Cockney.  Cornwallis' settlement, Halifax, would become the provincial capital, the primary commercial centre for the Maritime provinces, a strategic British military and naval outpost and an important east coast cultural centre. To offset the Catholic presence of Acadians, foreign Protestants (mainly German) were given land and founded Lunenburg. Nova Scotia itself saw considerable immigration from Scotland, particularly to communities such as Pictou in the northern part of the province and to Cape Breton Island, but this began only with the arrival of the Hector in 1773.

A few Germans came to New France when France colonized the area, but large-scale migration from Germany began only under British rule, when Governor Edward Cornwallis established Halifax, Nova Scotia in 1749. Known as the Foreign Protestants, the continental Protestants were encouraged to migrate to Nova Scotia between 1750 and 1752 to counterbalance the large number of Catholic Acadians. Family surnames, Lutheran churches, and village names along the South Shore of Nova Scotia retain their German heritage, such as Lunenburg. The first German church in Canada, the Little Dutch (Deutsch) Church in Halifax, is on land which was set aside for the German-speaking community in 1756. The church was designated a National Historic Site of Canada in 1997.

After the fall of New France to the British in 1759, a colonial governing class established itself in Quebec City. Larger numbers of English-speaking settlers arrived in the Eastern Townships and Montreal after the American Revolution.

A large group of Ulster Scots, many of whom had first settled in New Hampshire, moved to Truro, Nova Scotia in 1761.

New Brunswick became the home for many Scots. In 1761, a Highland regiment garrisoned Fort Frederick. The surrounding lands surveyed by Captain Bruce in 1762 attracted many Scottish traders when William Davidson of Caithness arrived to settle two years later. Their numbers were swelled by the arrival of thousands of loyalists of Scottish origin both during and after the American Revolution. One of the New Brunswick and Canada's most famous regiments was "The King's First American Regiment" founded in 1776. It was composed mostly of Highlanders, many of whom fought with their traditional kilts to the sound of bagpipes. The regiment distinguished itself when it defeated Washington's forces at the Battle of Brandywine. When it disbanded after the War, most of its members settled in New Brunswick.

In 1772, a wave of Gaels began to arrive in Prince Edward Island, and in 1773 the ship Hector brought 200 Gaels to Pictou, beginning a new stream of Highland emigration — the town's slogan is "The Birthplace of New Scotland". At the end of the 18th century, Cape Breton Island had become a centre of Scottish Gaelic settlement, where only Scottish Gaelic was spoken. Furthermore, a number of Scottish loyalists to the British crown, who had fled the United States in 1783, arrived in Glengarry County (in eastern Ontario) and Nova Scotia.

Late century 
Prince Edward Island (PEI) was also heavily influenced by Scottish Gaelic settlers. One prominent settler in PEI was John MacDonald of Glenaladale, who conceived the idea of sending Gaels to Nova Scotia on a grand scale after Culloden. The name Macdonald still dominates on the island, which received a large influx of settlers, predominantly Catholics from the Highlands, in the late 18th century.

The history of English Canadians is bound to the history of English settlement of North America, and particularly New England, because of the resettlement of many Loyalists following the American Revolution in areas that would form part of Canada.  Many of the fifty thousand Loyalists who were resettled to the north of the United States after 1783 came from families that had already been settled for several generations in North America and were from prominent families in Boston, New York and other east coast towns.  Although largely of British ancestry, these settlers had also intermarried with Huguenot and Dutch colonists and were accompanied by Loyalists of African descent.  Dispossessed of their property at the end of the Revolutionary War, the Loyalists arrived as refugees to settle primarily along the shores of southern Nova Scotia, the Bay of Fundy and the Saint John River and in Quebec to the east and southwest of Montreal. The colony of New Brunswick was created from western part of Nova Scotia at the instigation of these new English-speaking settlers.  The Loyalist settlements in southwestern Quebec formed the nucleus of what would become the province of Upper Canada and, after 1867, Ontario.

At the end of the 18th century, Cape Breton Island had become a centre of Scottish Gaelic settlement, where only Scottish Gaelic was spoken. Throughout the 18th and 19th centuries, Canadian Gaelic was spoken as the first language in much of "Anglophone" Canada, such as Nova Scotia, Prince Edward Island, and Glengarry County in Ontario. Gaelic was the third most commonly spoken language in Canada.

In the late 18th century, British colonies in North America were significantly affected by the outbreak and subsequent loss of the American Revolutionary War. At the time, Great Britain and its overseas empire were ruled by the German-descended King George III, who was also the Prince-Elector of Hanover, a state in what is now northwestern Germany. Notably, a number of soldiers fighting on what modern historiography terms the pro-British side of the conflict were members of regiments hired from various small German states. These soldiers were collectively known as "Hessians", since many of them came from Hesse. Following the defeat of British forces in the Revolutionary War, about 2,200 of them settled in Canada once their terms of service had expired or they had been released from American captivity. For example, a group from the Brunswick Regiment settled southwest of Montreal and south of Quebec City. In this, they formed part of a larger population movement composed of several waves of migration northward from the newly-founded United States to Upper and Lower Canada. In traditional Canadian historiography, these migrants are often grouped together under the broad label of United Empire Loyalists, obscuring particular ethnic and religious identities, as well as their exact motivations for migrating to Canada.

Welsh mapmaker David Thompson was one of the great explorers of the North West Company in the late 18th and early 19th centuries, and is often called "Canada's Greatest Geographer". He covered 130,000 kilometres on foot and surveyed most of the Canada–United States border in the early days of exploration.

19th century

Early century 
Upper Canada was a primary destination for English, Scottish and Scots-Irish settlers to Canada in the nineteenth century, and was on the front lines in the War of 1812 between the British Empire and the United States. The province also received immigrants from non English-speaking sources such as Germans, many of whom settled around Kitchener (formerly called Berlin). Ontario would become the most populous province in the Dominion of Canada at the time of Confederation, and, together with Montreal, formed the country's industrial heartland and emerged as an important cultural and media centre for English Canada.

English, Scottish, and Irish communities established themselves in Montreal throughout the 1800s. Montreal would become Canada's largest city and commercial hub in Canada.

In the early 19th century, a large group of Germans (Mennonites) fleed the United States was theMany of their families' ancestors had been from southern Germany or Switzerland. They began to move to what is now southwestern Ontario and settled around the Grand River, especially in Berlin, Ontario (now Kitchener) and in the northern part of what later became Waterloo County, Ontario. The same geographic area also attracted new German migrants from Europe, roughly 50,000 between the 1830 and 1860. Research indicates that there was no apparent conflict between the Germans from Europe and those who came from Pennsylvania.

Another large group of Scottish Gaels immigrated to Canada and settled in Prince Edward Island in 1803. This migration, primarily from the Isle of Skye, was organized by the Earl of Selkirk, Lord Thomas Douglas, 5th Earl of Selkirk. The Earl, who was sympathetic to the plight of the dispossessed crofters (tenant farmers in the Highlands), brought 800 colonists to Prince Edward Island. In 1811, he founded the Red River Colony as a Scottish colonization project on an area of 300,000 square kilometres (120,000 sq mi) in what would later be the province of Manitoba — land that was granted by the Hudson's Bay Company, in what is referred to as the Selkirk Concession. This formed the earliest English and Scottish settlements in Assiniboia (part of present-day Manitoba), involving some 300 largely Scottish colonists.

One of the first efforts to encourage Welsh emigration to Canada began in 1812, when Welsh native John Mathews endeavoured to bring his family to Canada. Mathews left home at a young age and went on to become a successful businessman in the United States. When he returned to Wales, he found his family living in poverty and became convinced they should emigrate to Canada. In 1817 his family settled in the township of Southwald, near what is now London, Ontario. By 1812 he had brought over more relatives who built homes on the  lots granted to them by Colonel Thomas Talbot.

Mid century 
A continual influx of immigrants from Scotland and Ulster meant that by 1843 there were over 30,000 Scots in New Brunswick.

Broader English, Scottish, and Irish settlement of British Columbia began in earnest with the founding of Fort Victoria in 1843 and the subsequent creation of the Colony of Vancouver Island in 1849.  The capital, Victoria developed during the height of the British Empire and long self-identified as being "more English than the English".

After the permanent settlement in Newfoundland by Irish in the late 18th and early 19th century, overwhelmingly from Waterford, increased immigration of the Irish elsewhere in Canada began in the decades following the War of 1812 and formed a significant part of The Great Migration of Canada. Between 1825 and 1845, 60% of all immigrants to Canada were Irish; in 1831 alone, some 34,000 arrived in Montreal. Between 1830 and 1850, 624,000 Irish arrived; in contextual terms, at the end of this period, the population of the provinces of Canada was 2.4 million. Besides Upper Canada (Ontario), Lower Canada (Quebec), the Maritime colonies of Nova Scotia, Prince Edward Island and New Brunswick, especially Saint John, were arrival points. Not all remained; many out-migrated to the United States or to Western Canada in the decades that followed. Few returned to Ireland.

During the Great Famine of Ireland (1845–52), Canada received the most destitute Irish Catholics, who left Ireland in grave circumstances. Land estate owners in Ireland would either evict landholder tenants to board on returning empty lumber ships, or in some cases pay their fares. Others left on ships from the overcrowded docks in Liverpool and Cork. Most of the Irish immigrants who came to Canada and the United States in the nineteenth century and before were Irish speakers, with many knowing no other language on arrival.

The first Yugoslavs (Serbs) to arrive in Canada came to British Columbia in the 1850s. Many of them came from the state of California in the United States, while others directly emigrated from the Balkans. They primarily originated from the Bay of Kotor and the Dalmatian coast which had similar climates as their destinations. The majority of these migrants came from territories controlled by Austria-Hungary for political and economic reasons, and only a small number came directly from Independent Serbia. Those who settled were typically young single men and employed in mining or forestry near such towns as Phoenix, Golden Prince Rupert and Kamloops.

The German Protestants developed the Lutheran Church along Canadian lines. In Waterloo County, Ontario, with large German elements that arrived after 1850, the Lutheran churches played major roles in the religious, cultural and social life of the community. Especially in Berlin, German was the dominant language spoken. Research indicates that there was no apparent conflict between the Germans from Europe and those who came from Pennsylvania.

Late century 

The French-English tensions that marked the establishment of the earliest English-speaking settlements in Nova Scotia were echoed on the Prairies in the late nineteenth century. The suppression of the rebellions allowed the government of Canada to proceed with a settlement of Manitoba, Saskatchewan and Alberta that was to create provinces that identified generally with English Canada in culture and outlook, although immigration included large numbers of people from non English-speaking European backgrounds, especially Scandinavians and Ukrainians.

The history of Yugoslav-Bosnian arrivals to Canada dates back to as far as the 19th century. Around the same time, many thousands of Yugoslav-Aegean Macedonians emigrated to Canada in the 1890s. They settled primarily in Ontario, especially Toronto. Many early Aegean Macedonian immigrants found industrial work in Toronto. Later migrants found work as factory in abattoirs and foundries. Chatham and Windsor attracted many Macedonian immigrants who worked along the railroads. Many later settled in Detroit, Michigan.

Western Canada started to attract in 1896 and draw large numbers of other German immigrants, mostly from Eastern Europe. Plautdietsch-speaking Russian Mennonites of Dutch-Prussian ancestry were especially prominent since they were persecuted by the Tsarist regime in Russia. The farmers were used to the harsh conditions of farming in southern Imperial Russia (now Ukraine) and so were some of the most successful in adapting to the Canadian Prairies.

20th century

Early century 
Nearly one million European immigrants, primarily from non-British and non-French origins, came through Pier 21 in Halifax, Nova Scotia in the early-mid 1900s.

In 1902, Welsh immigrants arrived from Patagonia, which had been incorporated into Argentina in 1881. Compulsory military service and a series of floods that ruined Welsh farmers' crops led to some emigrants resettling at Llewelyn near Bangor, Saskatchewan, where they once again took up farming. A community of Welsh farmers was also established at Wood River near Ponoka, Alberta.

In the early 20th century, Yugoslavs (Serbs) arrived in the prairies. In Saskatchewan, they took up farming. In Alberta, coal mining and road construction was a source of employment. Many Serbs worked on the construction of railway lines that now extend from Edmonton to the Pacific coast. Communities of Serbs emerged in Regina, Lethbridge, Edmonton and Calgary while significant populations formed in Atlin, British Columbia and Dawson, Yukon. In Ontario and Quebec, Serbs were drawn to work in the industry sector. By 1914, the Serbian community of the city of Hamilton, Ontario numbered around 1,000. Further Serb settlement was established in Niagara Falls, London, and Windsor. The first Serbian immigrants to the city of Toronto arrived in 1903; by 1914 there were more than 200 Serbs.

Until World War II, most people who today identify themselves as Yugoslav-Macedonian Canadians claimed a Bulgarian ethnic identity and were recorded as part of the Bulgarian ethnic group. The term Macedonian was used as a geographic/regional term rather than an ethnic one. At that time the political organization by the Slavic immigrants from the region of Macedonia, the Macedonian Patriotic Organization, also promoted the idea of Macedonian Slavs being Bulgarians.

During the Great War, military-aged Serb males who hailed from Serbia or Montenegro were considered allies but those who were born in Austro-Hungarian territories were deemed enemy aliens by Canadian law, even though their sympathies tended to lie with the allied cause. The latter were restricted in their freedom of movements, had to wear special identity cards and had to identify themselves regularly at the police station. Several hundred were interned in prison camps throughout the country under terrible conditions. Physicist Mihajlo Pupin, Serbia's consul in New York during the war, and Antun Seferović, the honorary consul of Serbia in Montreal, advocated for the rights of the classified aliens and internees through diplomacy via the Srpska Narodna Odbrana u Kanadi (Serbian National League of Canada) which resulted in exemption, compensation and the release of many ethnic Serbs. Another advocate for the rights of Serbs of Austro-Hungarian origin was Serbian-born court interpreter Bud Protich, who enlisted in the Canadian Army and was wounded in action in 1917.

Mid to late century 

German immigration and settlement to Canada accelerated in the 1920s, when the United States imposed quotas on Central and Eastern European immigration. Soon, Canada imposed its own limits, however, and prevented most of those trying to flee the Third Reich from moving to Canada. Many of the Mennonites settled in the areas of Winnipeg and Steinbach, and the area just north of Saskatoon.

Victoria Hayward described the cultural changes of the Canadian Prairies as a "mosaic" in the 1920s, as hundreds of thousands of immigrants from central and eastern Europe settled across the Prairies beginning in earnest during the late 19th century, with large scale immigration flows lasting through the mid-20th century.

After 1921, all immigrants from Yugoslavia, including Serbs, were designated as "Yugoslavs". The interwar period saw a major increase in Serbian immigration to Canada. More than 30,000 Yugoslavs came to Canada between 1919 and 1939, including an estimated 10,000 Serbs. Many of these immigrants were single, working men who settled in the northern region of the province of Ontario.

Another early use of the term mosaic to refer to Canadian society was by John Murray Gibbon, in his 1938 book Canadian Mosaic.  Gibbon clearly disapproved of the American melting-pot concept.  He saw the melting pot as a process by which immigrants and their descendants were encouraged to cut off ties with their countries and cultures of origin so as to assimilate into the American way of life.

In the aftermath of the Holocaust, displaced Jews emigrated to Canada from Europe, rejuvenating Canada's Yiddish-language European culture.

After the Second World War, Serbian political émigrés who were opposed to the newly established Yugoslav communist government sought refuge in Canada. Many of these were POWs and laborers from Austria and Germany who refused to return to their homeland. They settled in cities such as Toronto, Sudbury and Hamilton. Later, between 1957 and 1971, some 23,000 Yugoslavs arrived in Canada, of whom 10-15% were Serbs. They established organizations, newspapers and cultural events.

A community of Portuguese immigrants, primarily from the Azores Islands, came to settle in Canada beginning in significant numbers in 1953.

Demography

Population 
Beginning with the first Canadian census in 1871, the European Canadian population as a percentage of the total Canadian population had a peak of 98.5 percent. Since then, their proportion of the total Canadian population has been decreasing gradually since the mid-20th century to the most recent census in 2021. The actual decrease in the percentage of the population who are of European origins is hard to quantify, because individuals who fill out the census can self-identify under more than one category, based on their personal family history.  Statistics Canada advises that the total number of people listed by ethnic origin is actually larger than the total population estimate.   It is therefore not possible to express the number of individuals of European origin as a percentage of the total population.

The 2021 census recorded Canadians of European descent in the following categories:  British Isles origins;  French origins;  other Western European origins; other Northern European origins; Southern European origins; Southeast European origins; Eastern European origins; and other European origins.

"Canadian" was the single largest ethnic origin reported in the 2021 census, reported by 5,677,205 individuals, although the grouping from the British Isles was collectively larger, at 10,712,280. The British category included 5,322,830 English, 4,392,200 Scottish, 4,413,115 Irish, and 455,720 Welsh.  It was followed by French at 4,011,665.  Other large groups included individuals of German (2,955,695), Italian (1,546,390), Ukrainian (1,258,635), Dutch (988,585), and Polish (982,820) origin.

Ethnic and national origins

Language 
In the 2021 census, the largest non-official European mother tongue languages were Spanish (538,870), Italian (319,505), German (272,865) and Portuguese (240,680) and Russian (197,905). English and French are not included in this table because most Canadians have one of those languages as their mother tongue, regardless of their ethnic origin.

Immigration

Culture 

The various cultures of the Canadians of European descent have had a predominant influence on the culture of Canada. Over time, many people of European Canadian origins have brought with them or contributed literature, art, architecture, cinema and theater, religion and philosophy, ethics, agricultural skills, foods, medicine, science and technology, fashion and clothing styles, music, language, business, economics, legal system, political system, and social and technological innovation to Canadian culture. European settlers brought with them European plants, animals, viruses and bacteria, remaking significant portions of the Canadian ecology and landscape in the image of their homelands. Canadian culture evolved in large part from the culture that the English, French, Scottish, Welsh, and Irish settlers brought with them, long before Canada became a country. Much of English-Canadian culture shows influences from the cultures of the British Isles, with later influence, due to 19th-century immigration from different regions of Europe, such as Eastern Europe. Colonial ties to Great Britain and the cultural presence of the United States spread the English language, legal system and other cultural attributes.

Elements of Aboriginal, French, British and more recent immigrant customs, languages and religions have combined to form the culture of Canada and thus a Canadian identity, without eradicating specific regional or cultural identities such as Aboriginal or Québecois. Canada has also been strongly influenced by its linguistic, geographic and economic neighbour, the United States.

Many Canadians see the Cultural Mosaic, which promotes multiculturalism and an equality of cultures, as a distinctive feature of Canadian culture, one that sets it apart from the melting pot philosophy of many Americans.

Music 

Another area of cultural influence are Canadian Patriotic songs:
Canadian National Anthem - Two Canadians of French descent Adolphe-Basile Routhier wrote the lyrics and Calixa Lavallée composed the music in 1880. The English lyrics were written in 1908 by Scottish-Canadian Robert Stanley Weir. The lyrics have also been translated into many other languages spoken by different Canadian minority populations, including other European languages.
The Maple Leaf Forever - is an older but unofficial national anthem written by Scotsman Alexander Muir in 1867. It was in consideration for official national anthem, however, as no French version was ever written, it was never popular with Francophones.

Sport 

Ice Hockey - British soldiers and immigrants to Canada and the United States brought their stick-and-ball games with them and played them on the ice and snow of winter. Ice hockey was first played in Canada during the early nineteenth century, based on similar sports such as field hockey that were played in Europe. The sport was originally played with a stick and ball, but in 1860 a group of English veterans from the Royal Canadian Rifle Regiment played a game in Kingston, Ontario, utilising a puck for what is believed to be the first time. This match, played on the frozen harbour by the city, is sometimes considered to be the birth of modern ice hockey. According to legend, the first hockey pucks were molded from fresh cow dung that was then allowed to freeze in below-zero outdoor temperatures. Whether or not this was how the first puck was made, the use of horse or cow droppings was common thereafter, a distinctively Euro-Canadian aspect of the game made possible by the country's Northern climate.

Notable people

Prime Ministers 

Most of the heritage that all twenty-three Canadian Prime Ministers come from (or in some combination thereof): is British (English, Scottish, Ulster Scot or Welsh) ancestry. Later Canadian Prime Ministers' ancestry can often be traced to ancestors from multiple nations in Europe.

1st    John A. Macdonald (Scottish)
2nd    Alexander Mackenzie (Scottish)
3rd    John Abbott (English)
4th    John Thompson (Irish)
5th    Mackenzie Bowell (English)
6th    Charles Tupper (English)
7th    Wilfrid Laurier (French)
8th    Robert Borden (English)
9th    Arthur Meighen (Scots-Irish)
10th   William Lyon Mackenzie King (Scottish)
11th   R. B. Bennett (English, Irish)
12th   Louis St. Laurent (French, Irish)

13th   John Diefenbaker (German, Scottish)
14th   Lester B. Pearson (Anglo-Irish)
15th   Pierre Trudeau (French, Scottish)
16th   Joe Clark (Scottish, Irish)
17th   John Turner (English)
18th   Brian Mulroney (Irish)
19th   Kim Campbell (Scottish)
20th   Jean Chrétien (French)
21st   Paul Martin (Irish, French, Scottish)
22nd   Stephen Harper (English, Scottish)
23rd   Justin Trudeau (French, Scottish, English)

Diaspora 

Substantial numbers of European Canadians of French extraction migrated to New England beginning in the late nineteenth century, taking jobs in the cotton mills there and forming a Catholic French-speaking immigrant community. Notable francophone European-Canadian Americans included Beat novelist Jack Kerouac and best-selling novelist Grace Metalious.

Notable Canadians of European descent who settled in the United States or lived in the United States for extended periods have included Joni Mitchell, Lorne Michaels, Hal Foster, Todd McFarlane, Pamela Anderson, Justin Bieber, Seth Rogen, and William Shatner. Ted Cruz was a member of the Canadian diaspora who became active in American politics as a dual citizen; he renounced  his Canadian citizenship when competing to be the Republican presidential candidate, effective 2016.

See also

 European emigration
 Métis people (Canada)
 Ethnic origins of people in Canada
 White Americans
 European Americans
 Demographics of Canada
 White demographic decline

References

Bibliography

Further reading

 Allen, Willow Samara. "Learning to become white girls in a settler colonial context: Exploring the racial socialization of white Euro-Canadian women." Settler Colonial Studies 10.3 (2020): 378–402.
 
 

 
 Kralt, John. "Country of Birth of Parents And Ethnic Origins  - A Comparison of Reporting Patterns in the 2001 Census,"
; 1300pp; comprehensive scholarly coverage of every group

 McLean, Lorna R. "Education, identity, and citizenship in early modern Canada." Journal of Canadian Studies/Revue d'études canadiennes 41.1 (2007): 5-30.

Statistical
 
 

 
 
European diaspora in North America
Ethnic groups in Canada